The Malaysia women's national rugby union team represents Malaysia in rugby union. They played their first international match in 2009.

History

Results summary
(Full internationals only)

Results

Full internationals

Other matches

External links
 Malaysia on IRB.com

Rugby union in Malaysia
R
Asian national women's rugby union teams
Women's national rugby union teams